Malinovo is a rural locality (a village) in Verkhnevarzhenskoye Rural Settlement, Velikoustyugsky District, Vologda Oblast, Russia. The population was 15 as of 2002.

Geography 
Malinovo is located 71 km southeast of Veliky Ustyug (the district's administrative centre) by road. Stryukovo is the nearest rural locality.

References 

Rural localities in Velikoustyugsky District